The United Arab Emirates (the UAE or the Emirates) is a country in the eastern part of the Arabian Peninsula located on the southeastern coast of the Persian Gulf and the northwestern coast of the Gulf of Oman. The UAE consists of seven emirates and was founded on 2 December 1971 as a federation. Six of the seven emirates (Abu Dhabi, Dubai, Sharjah, Ajman, Umm Al Quwain and Fujairah) combined on that date. The seventh, Ras al Khaimah, joined the federation on 10 February 1972. The seven sheikdoms were formerly known as the Trucial States, in reference to the treaty relations established with the British in the 19th century.

Artifacts uncovered in the UAE show a history of human habitation, transmigration and trade spanning over 125,000 years. The area was previously home to the Magan people known to the Sumerians, who traded with both coastal towns and bronze miners and smelters from the interior. A rich history of trade with the Harappan culture of the Indus Valley is also evidenced by finds of jewelry and other items and there is also extensive early evidence of trade with Afghanistan and Bactria as well as the Levant.

Through the three defined Iron Ages and the subsequent Hellenistic period, the area remained an important coastal trading entrepôt. As a result of the response of the Al Azd to the message of Muhammed, the area became Islamised in the 7th century, a position consolidated by the Ridda Wars and the bloody and definitive Battle of Dibba. The Islamic era saw the area emerge once again as an important centre for trade, centred particularly around the ports of Julfar, Dibba and Khor Fakkan. These, linked to the vast Eastern Arab trading network that centred around the Kingdom of Hormuz, formed an important link in the Arab monopoly of trade between the East and Europe. In the late Islamic era, a number of small trading ports developed alongside the development of bustan agriculture in inland oases such as Liwa, Al Ain and Dhaid and tribal bedouin society co-existed with settled populations in the coastal areas.

A number of incursions and  battles took place along the coast when the Portuguese, under Afonso de Albuquerque, invaded the area and disrupted the Arab trade networks, triggering a decline in trade and a rise in regional conflict following the fragmentation of Hormuzi authority. Subsequent conflicts between the maritime communities of the Trucial Coast and the British led to the sacking of Ras Al Khaimah by British forces in 1809 and again in 1819, which resulted in the first of a number of British treaties with the Trucial Rulers in 1820. These treaties, starting with the General Maritime Treaty of 1820, led to peace and prosperity along the coast and supported a lively trade in high quality natural pearls as well as a resurgence in other regional trade. A further treaty of 1892 devolved external relations to the British in return for protectorate status.

A British decision, taken in early 1968, to withdraw from its involvement in the Trucial States, led to the decision to found a Federation. This was agreed between two of the most influential Trucial Rulers, Sheikh Zayed bin Sultan Al Nahyan of Abu Dhabi and Sheikh Rashid bin Saeed Al Maktoum of Dubai. The two invited other Trucial Rulers to join the Federation. At one stage it seemed likely Bahrain and Qatar would also join the Union of Arab Emirates, but both eventually decided on independence.

Today, the UAE is a modern, oil exporting country with a highly diversified economy, with Dubai in particular developing into a global city and a hub for tourism, retail, and finance, home to the world's tallest building, and largest man-made seaport.

Prehistory 

In 2011 primitive hand-axes, as well as several kinds of scrapers and perforators, were excavated at the Jebel Faya archaeological site in the United Arab Emirates. These tools resemble the types used by early modern humans in East Africa. Through the technique of thermoluminescence dating the artefacts were placed at 125,000 years old. This forms some of the earliest evidence of modern humans found anywhere outside Africa and implies modern humans left Africa much earlier than previously thought. The site of these discoveries has been preserved alongside finds of later cultures, including tombs and other finds from the Hafit, Umm Al Nar, Wadi Suq, Iron Age, Hellenistic and Islamic periods, at Sharjah's Mleiha Archaeological Centre.

Glacial period

During the glacial maximum period, 68,000 to 8000 BCE, Eastern Arabia is thought to have been uninhabitable. Finds from the Stone Age Arabian Bifacial and Ubaid cultures (including knapped stone arrow and axe heads as well as Ubaid pottery) show human habitation in the area from 5000 to 3100 BCE and define a linkage between the human settlements of the Gulf and those of Mesopotamia. The archaeological record shows that Arabian Bifacial/Ubaid period came to an abrupt end in eastern Arabia and the Oman peninsula at 3800 BC, just after the phase of lake lowering and onset of dune reactivation.

Within the area of Baynunah in the western region of the Emirate of Abu Dhabi, a camel-slaughter site dating to about 6,000 years ago has been discovered.

Hafit period

The Hafit period followed a fallow period in the archaeological record of the west coast of the Emirates, known as the 'Dark Millennium', likely triggered by climate change. The re-emergence of human habitation, the Hafit period was named after extensive finds of burials of distinctive beehive shaped tombs in the mountainous area of Jebel Hafeet in Al Ain. Continued links to Mesopotamia are evidenced by finds of Jemdet Nasr pottery. The period defines early Bronze Age human settlement in the United Arab Emirates and Oman in the period from 3,200 to 2,600 BC. Hafit period tombs and remains have also been located across the UAE and Oman in sites such as Bidaa bint Saud, Jebel Buhais and Buraimi.

Bronze Age: Umm Al Nar and Wadi Suq Cultures

Umm Al Nar (also known as Umm an-Nar) was a Bronze Age culture variously defined by archaeologists as existing around 2600 to 2000 BCE in the area of the modern-day UAE and Oman. The etymology derives from the island of the same name which lies adjacent to Abu Dhabi. The key site is well protected, but its location between a refinery and a sensitive military area means public access is currently restricted. The UAE authorities are working to improve public access to the site, and plan to make this part of the Abu Dhabi cultural locations. One element of the Umm Al Nar culture is circular tombs typically characterized by well fitted stones in the outer wall and multiple human remains within.

The Umm Al Nar culture covers some six centuries (2600-2000 BCE), and includes further extensive evidence both of trade with the Sumerian and Akkadian kingdoms as well as with the Indus Valley. The increasing sophistication of the Umm Al Nar people included the domestication of animals.

It was followed by the Wadi Suq culture, which dominated the region from 2000 to 1300 BC. Key archaeological sites pointing to major trading cities extant during both periods exist on both the Western and Eastern coasts of the UAE and in Oman, including Dalma, Umm Al Nar, Sufouh, Ed Dur, Tell Abraq and Kalba. The burial sites at both Shimal and Seih Al Harf in Ras Al Khaimah show evidence of transitional Umm Al Nar to Wadi Suq burials.

The domestication of camels and other animals took place during the Wadi Suq era (2000-1300 BCE), leading to increased inland settlement and the cultivation of diverse crops, including the date palm. Increasingly sophisticated metallurgy, pottery and stone carving led to more sophisticated weaponry and other implements even as evidence of strong trading links with the Indus Valley and Mesopotamia dwindled.

Iron Age

From 1,200 BC to the advent of Islam in Eastern Arabia, through three distinctive Iron Ages (Iron Age 1, 1200-1000 BC; Iron Age II, 1000-600 BC and Iron Age III 600-300 BC) and the Hellenistic Mleiha period (300 BC onward), the area was variously occupied by Archaemenid and other forces and saw the construction of fortified settlements and extensive husbandry thanks to the development of the falaj irrigation system. Early finds of aflaj, particularly those around the desert city of Al Ain, have been cited as the earliest evidence of the construction of these waterways. Important Iron Age centres in the UAE have rendered an unusual richness in finds to archaeologists, particularly the spectacular metallurgical centre of Saruq Al Hadid in what is today Dubai. Other important Iron Age settlements in the country include Al Thuqeibah, Bidaa bint Saud, Ed-Dur and Tell Abraq.

Advent of Islam and the Middle Ages

The arrival of envoys from Muhammad in 632 heralded the conversion of the region to Islam. After Muhammad's death, one of the major battles of the Ridda Wars was fought at Dibba, to the east coast of the present-day Emirates. The defeat of the non-Muslims, including Laqit bin Malik Al-Azdi, in this battle resulted in the triumph of Islam in the Arabian Peninsula.

Over many centuries, Julfar became a wealthy port and pearling centre from which dhows travelled throughout the Indian Ocean.

The pearling industry and the Portuguese empire: 16th - 18th century 

The pearling industry was part of the main economy of the coastal communities across Eastern Arabia and thrived in the relative calm at sea, providing both income and employment to the people of the Persian Gulf. In total, about two to three thousand local ships were involved in the seasonal extraction of pearls from communities across the Gulf. The annual income was over half million curzados (old Portuguese currency) and workers at Julfar and surrounding areas were paid in pearls instead of cash. In 1907, some 4,500 pearling boats were operating from Gulf ports in an industry employing over 74,000 men.

Western coast 
The main centers of pearling extended from Bida (Doha) to Dubai. The main season was in Dalma, and was referred to as al-ghaws al-kabir ( The Great Dive). The huge rise in demand by the expanding Indian and European market led to the exploitation of more distant banks such as the areas in Abu Dhabi and Dubai. The enlargement of the international merchant network turned it into an integrated industry and enforced the central power of the local rulers. Fleets remained at sea from June to late September and every able bodied male joined the fleet. Pearling provided 80% of Sheikh Zayed bin Khalifa Al Nahyan (Known as Zayed the Great) revenues, allowing him to distribute largesse and gave him great influence.

Northern and Persian coast 
The Portuguese Empire took over the taxation system which existed in the northern coast and was collected by the Sultan of Hormuz from 1523 to 1622 and continued to gain revenue from it up to the second decade of the 18th century. The Portuguese employed a system of issuing navigation permits (called Cartazes) and the payment of taxes (called Magumbayas). Centers for the distribution of the permits and collection of taxes were in ports from Julfar to Khasab. On the Persian coast, the Portuguese did the same to the Arabs from Bandar Kong up to the southwest coast of Iran. Any ship sailing without the possession of a Portuguese license was liable to be captured by the Portuguese Armada. Fear of the Armada's cannons created a naval subjugation and maritime control.

Pearling culture 
At the start of the pearling season, which was from June to September, thousands of local ships would gather at a fixed place with necessary provisions to last for up to three months at sea and a day of commencement would be agreed on. On that day, great celebrations were held along with the customary observance of religious rites and the tradition of charming sharks so that they would not harm the divers. The ships would then disperse on a clear, windless day when the sea was calm.

Each ship carried divers who then dived to the bottom of the sea to gather pearls. In order to enable the divers to reach the bottom, two heavy stones were tied to the diver's feet and a chord to his waist. The chord end was held in the hands of those who were to pull him out. When the bag of pearls became full, the diver would signal to be pulled out with those who pulled having to remain alert to avoid the diver dying from a lack of oxygen.

Decline of the pearling industry 
The Japanese cultured pearl, initially regarded as a wonder and shown at expos and other fairs, started to be produced in commercial quantities in the late 1920s. The influx of inexpensive, high quality pearls onto world markets took place alongside the economic impact of the Great Depression. The result on the Gulf's pearl markets was devastating. In 1929, 60 of Dubai's pearling boats (in 1907 there were 335 boats operating out of the port) stayed in port throughout the season.

The complex system of financing that underpinned the pearling industry, the relationship between owners, pearl merchants, nakhudas (captains) and divers and pullers fell apart and left an increasingly large number of working men in the town facing destitution.

In the 1930s, a record number of slaves approached the British Agent seeking manumission, a reflection of the parlous state of the pearling fleet and its owners.

British empire: 19th - 20th century 

Ottoman attempts to expand their sphere of influence into the Indian Ocean failed and it was Portuguese expansion into the Indian Ocean in the early 16th century following Vasco da Gama's route of exploration that resulted in the sacking of many coastal towns by the Portuguese. Following this conflict, the Al Qasimi, a seafaring tribe based on the Northern Peninsula and Lingeh on the Iranian coast, dominated the waterways of the Southern Gulf until the arrival of British ships, which came into conflict with the incumbents.

Thereafter, the region was known to the British as the "Pirate Coast", as Al Qasimi (to the British 'Joasmee') raiders based there harassed the shipping industry despite (or perhaps because of) British navy patrols in the area in the 18th and 19th centuries. A number of conflicts took place, notable between 1809 and 1819.

Persian Gulf campaign of 1809 

After years of incidents where British shipping had fallen foul of the aggressive Al Qasimi, with the first incidents taking place under the rule of Saqr bin Rashid Al Qasimi in 1797, an expeditionary force embarked for Ras Al Khaimah in 1809, the Persian Gulf campaign of 1809. This campaign led to the signing of a peace treaty between the British and Hussan Bin Rahmah, the Al Qasimi leader. This broke down in 1815. J. G. Lorimer contends that after the dissolution of the arrangement, the Al Qasimi "now indulged in a carnival of maritime lawlessness, to which even their own previous record presented no parallel".

After an additional year of recurring attacks, at the end of 1818 Hassan bin Rahmah made conciliatory overtures to Bombay and was "sternly rejected." Naval resources commanded by the Al Qasimi during this period were estimated at around 60 large boats headquartered in Ras Al Khaimah, carrying from 80 to 300 men each, as well as 40 smaller vessels housed in other nearby ports.

Persian Gulf campaign of 1819 and General Maritime Treaty of 1820 

In November 1819, the British embarked on an expedition against the Al Qasimi, led by Major General William Keir Grant, voyaging to Ras Al Khaimah with a platoon of 3,000 soldiers supported by a number of warships, including HMS Liverpool and Curlew. The British extended an offer to Said bin Sultan of Muscat in which he would be made ruler of the Pirate Coast if he agreed to assist the British in their expedition. Obligingly, he sent a force of 600 men and two ships.

With the fall of Ras Al Khaimah and the final surrender of Dhayah Fort, the British established a garrison in Ras Al Khaimah of 800 sepoys and artillery, before visiting Jazirat Al Hamra, which was found to be deserted. They went on to destroy the fortifications and larger vessels of Umm Al Qawain, Ajman, Fasht, Sharjah, Abu Hail, and Dubai. Ten vessels that had taken shelter in Bahrain were also destroyed.

As a consequence of the campaign, the next year, a peace treaty was signed with all the sheikhs of the coastal communities, the General Maritime Treaty of 1820.

The 1820 treaty was followed by the 1847 'Engagement to Prohibit Exportation of Slaves From Africa on board of Vessels Belonging to Bahrain and to the Trucial States and the Allow Right of Search of April–May 1847'. By this time, some of the smaller Sheikhdoms had been subsumed by their larger neighbours and signatories were Sheikh Sultan bin Saqr of Ras Al Khaimah; Sheikh Maktoum of Dubai; Sheikh Abdulaziz of Ajman, Sheikh Abdullah bin Rashid of Umm Al Quwain and Sheikh Saeed bin Tahnoun of Abu Dhabi.

The treaty only granted protection to British vessels and did not prevent coastal wars between tribes. As a result, raids continued intermittently until 1835, when the sheikhs agreed not to engage in hostilities at sea for a period of one year. The truce was renewed every year until 1853.

Perpetual Maritime Truce 

In 1853, the Perpetual Maritime Truce of 4 May 1853 prohibited any act of aggression at sea and was signed by Abdulla bin Rashid of Umm Al Quwain; Hamed bin Rashid of Ajman; Saeed bin Butti of Dubai; Saeed bin Tahnoun ('Chief of the Beniyas') and Sultan bin Saqr ('Chief of the Joasmees'). A further engagement for the suppression of the slave trade was signed in 1856 and then in 1864, the 'Additional Article to the Maritime Truce Providing for the Protection of the Telegraph Line and Stations, Dated 1864'. An agreement regarding the treatment of absconding debtors followed in June 1879.

Exclusive Agreement 
Signed in 1892, the 'Exclusive Agreement' bound the Rulers not to enter into 'any agreement or correspondence with any Power other than the British Government' and that without British assent, they would not 'consent to the residence within my territory of the agent of any other government' and that they would not 'cede, sell, mortgage or otherwise give for occupation any part of my territory, save to the British Government. In return, the British promised to protect the Trucial Coast from all aggression by sea and to help in case of land attack.

Trucial States affairs 

Significantly, the treaties with the British were maritime in nature and the Trucial Rulers were free to manage their internal affairs, although they often brought the British (and their naval firepower) to bear on their frequent disputes. This was particularly the case where disputes involved indebtedness to British and Indian nationals.

During the late 19th and early 20th-century a number of changes occurred to the status of various emirates, for instance emirates such as Rams and Zyah (now part of Ras Al Khaimah) were signatories to the original 1819 treaty but not recognised by the British as trucial states in their own right, while the emirate of Fujairah, today one of the seven emirates that comprise the United Arab Emirates, was not recognised as a Trucial State until 1952. Kalba, recognised as a Trucial State by the British in 1936 is today part of the emirate of Sharjah.

Until 1930's, the British refrained from interfering in the internal affairs of the Trucial Sheikdoms as long as the peace was kept in contrast to their policy in Oman where they were concerned on maintaining stability of Oman's Sultanate and were eager to maintain their airbase in Masirah Island. According to a British official:

Discovery of oil 

In the 1930s, the first oil company teams carried out preliminary surveys. An onshore concession was granted to Petroleum Development (Trucial Coast) in 1939, and an offshore concession to D'Arcy Exploration Ltd in 1952. Exploration concessions were limited to British companies only following the conclusion of agreements with the Trucial Sheikhs and British government. Management of the Trucial Coast moved from the British Government in Bombay to the Foreign Office in London in 1947, with Indian independence. The Political Resident in the Gulf headed the small team responsible for liaison with the Trucial Sheikhs and was based in Bushire until 1946, when his office was moved to Bahrain. Day-to-day management of affairs was carried out by the 'Native Agent', a post established with the 1820 treaty and abolished in 1949. This agent was bolstered by a British Political Officer based in Sharjah, from 1937 onwards.

Oil was discovered under an old pearling bed in the Persian Gulf, Umm Shaif, in 1958, and in the desert at Murban in 1960. The first cargo of crude was exported from Jabel Dhanna in the Emirate of Abu Dhabi in 1962. As oil revenues increased, the ruler of Abu Dhabi, Sheikh Zayed bin Sultan Al Nahyan, undertook a massive construction program, building schools, housing, hospitals and roads. When Dubai's oil exports commenced in 1969, Sheikh Rashid bin Saeed Al Maktoum, the ruler of Dubai, was also able to use oil revenues to improve his people's quality of life.

Buraimi dispute 

In 1952 a group of some 80 Saudi Arabian guards, 40 of whom were armed, led by the Saudi Emir of Ras Tanura, Turki Abdullah al Otaishan, crossed Abu Dhabi territory and occupied Hamasa, one of three Omani villages in the Oasis, claiming it as part of the eastern Province of Saudi Arabia. The Sulṭan of Muscat and Imam of Oman gathered their forces to expel the Saudis but were persuaded by the British Government to exercise restraint pending attempts to settle the dispute by arbitration. A British military build-up took place, leading to the implementation of a standstill agreement and the referral of the dispute to an international arbitration tribunal. In 1955 arbitration proceedings began in Geneva only to collapse when the British arbitrator, Sir Reader Bullard, objected to Saudi Arabian attempts to influence the tribunal and withdrew. A few weeks later, the Saudi party was forcibly ejected from Hamasa by the Trucial Oman Levies.

The dispute was finally settled in 1974 by an agreement, known as the Treaty of Jeddah, between Sheikh Zayed (then President of the UAE) and King Faisal of Saudi Arabia.

Independence and union: 1960 - 1971 

In the early 1960s, oil was discovered in Abu Dhabi, an event that led to quick unification calls made by UAE sheikdoms. Sheikh Zayed bin Sultan Al Nahyan became ruler of Abu Dhabi in 1966, and the British started losing their oil investments and contracts to U.S. oil companies.

The British had earlier started a development office that helped in some small developments in the emirates. The sheikhs of the emirates then decided to form a council to coordinate matters between them and took over the development office. They formed the Trucial States Council, and appointed Adi Bitar, Sheikh Rashid bin Saeed Al Maktoum's legal advisor, as Secretary General and Legal Advisor to the council. This council was terminated once the United Arab Emirates was formed.

British withdrawal 
By 1966, the British government had come to the conclusion that it could no longer afford to govern what is now the United Arab Emirates. Much deliberation took place in the British parliament, with a number of MPs arguing that the Royal Navy would not be able to defend the Trucial Sheikhdoms. Denis Healey, who, at the time, was the UK Secretary of State for Defence, reported that the British Armed Forces were severely overextended, and in some respects, dangerously under-equipped to defend the Sheikhdoms. On 16 January 1968, British Prime Minister Harold Wilson announced the decision to end the treaty relationships with the seven Trucial Sheikhdoms which had been, together with Bahrain and Qatar, under British protection. The British decision to withdraw was reaffirmed in March 1971 by Prime Minister Edward Heath.

The region faced a host of serious local and regional problems. There were Iranian claims over Bahrain and other islands in the Gulf, territorial disputes between Qatar and Bahrain over Zubarah and the Hawar Islands, and the Buraimi dispute was still unresolved between Saudi Arabia, Abu Dhabi and Oman. On the issue of the shah of Iran's intentions, there are conflicting views: Abdullah Omran Taryam states that Iran was contemplating the occupation of Bahrain and other islands in the Gulf, while Alvandi Roham writes that the shah had no intention of using force to resolve the Bahrain question and was seeking a “package deal” with Great Britain over the Tunb Islands and Abu Musa, which was refused. The rulers of the emirates believed that Britain's continued presence constituted a real guarantee of the region's safety, and some genuinely wanted Britain not to withdraw. With this in mind, days after the British announcement to withdraw, Sheikh Zayed tried to persuade them to honour the protection treaties by offering to pay in full the costs of keeping British armed forces in the Emirates. However, the British Labour government rebuffed the offer.

Federation of nine emirates 

After Labour MP Goronwy Roberts informed Sheikh Zayed of the news of British withdrawal, the nine Persian Gulf sheikhdoms attempted to form a federation of Arab emirates. The federation was first proposed in February 1968 when the rulers of Abu Dhabi and Dubai met in the desert location of Argoub El Sedirah, and agreed on the principle of Union. They announced their intention to form a coalition, extending an invitation to other Persian Gulf states to join. Later that month, in a summit meeting attended by the rulers of Bahrain, Qatar and the Trucial Coast, the government of Qatar proposed the formation of a federation of Arab emirates to be governed by a higher council composing of nine rulers. This proposal was accepted and a declaration of union was approved. There were, however, several disagreements between the rulers on matters such as the location of the capital, the drafting of the constitution and the distribution of ministries.

Further political issues surfaced as a result of Bahrain attempting to impose a leading role in the nine-state union, as well as the emergence of a number of differences between the rulers of the Trucial Coast, Bahrain and Qatar, the latter two being in a long-running dispute over the Hawar Islands. While Dubai's ruler, Sheikh Rashid, had a strong connection to the Qatari ruling family, including the royal intermarriage of his daughter with the son of the Qatari emir, the relationship between Abu Dhabi and Dubai (also cemented by intermarriage, Rashid's wife was a member of Abu Dhabi's ruling family) was to endure the break-up of the talks with both Bahrain and Qatar. Overall, there were only four meetings between the nine rulers. The last such meeting, which took place in Abu Dhabi, saw Zayed bin Sultan Al Nahyan elected as the first president of the federation. There were stalemates on numerous issues during the meeting, including the position of vice-president, the defense of the federation, and whether a constitution was required.

Shortly after the meeting, the Political Agent in Abu Dhabi revealed the British government's interests in the outcome of the session, prompting Qatar to withdraw from the federation apparently over what it perceived as foreign interference in internal affairs. The nine-emirate federation was consequently disbanded despite efforts by Saudi Arabia, Kuwait and Britain to reinvigorate discussions. Bahrain became independent in August 1971, and Qatar in September 1971.

Declaration of the union 1971–1972 

On 29 and 30 November 1971, a contingent of the Iranian army supported by the Iranian naval forces occupied the islands of Abu Musa and the Lesser and Greater Tunbs. In Greater Tunb, 6 policemen clashed with approximately 2,000 Iranian troops and in the ensuing skirmish 4 Ras Al Khaimah policemen and 3 Iranian soldiers were killed. The Iranian troops then demolished the police station, the school, and a number of houses, and forced the natives to leave the island. The deceased were buried on the island while the residents were put on fishing boats and expelled to Ras Al Khaimah. The Imperial Iranian Navy seized the islands with little resistance from the tiny Arab police force stationed there. The population of Greater Tunb in 1971 was 150. The first soldier killed on Greater Tunb was Salem Suhail bin Khamis who was shot and killed after he refused to lower the Ras Al Khaimah flag. The death of the 20 year-old bin Khamis is marked as the date of the first martyr in the United Arab Emirates and November 30 is celebrated as Commemoration Day. The ruler of Sharjah was forced to agree to negotiate for Iranian troops to occupy Abu Musa. His options were either to negotiate to save part of the territory or forego the restoration of the remaining part of the island for good.

When the British-Trucial Sheikhdoms treaty expired on 1 December 1971, the Trucial States became independent sheikhdoms. Four more Trucial states (Ajman, Sharjah, Umm Al Quwain and Fujairah) joined Abu Dhabi and Dubai in signing the UAE's founding treaty, with a draft constitution in place drafted in record time to meet the 2 December 1971 deadline. On that date, at the Dubai Guesthouse (now known as Union House), the emirates agreed to enter into a union to be called the United Arab Emirates. Ras al-Khaimah joined in February 1972.

On 24 January 1972, the former deposed ruler of Sharjah, Sheikh Saqr bin Sultan Al Qasimi, with an armed group supported by Ras Al Khaimah forced his way into the palace of Sharjah's ruler Sheikh Khalid bin Mohammed Al Qasimi, occupied it, and demanded to be recognized as the sole ruler of Sharjah. Saqr had been deposed in 1965 by the British because he supported and received assistance from the Arab League, which Britain objected to at the time. He saw the opportunity to make a comeback as the British had terminated their commitments to the Trucial States. The incident led to UAE defence force mobilising for the first time. In a joint action this force and the Abu Dhabi defence force, together with popular resistance in Sharjah, managed to bring the situation under control and to cut the lines of supplies from Ras Al-Khaimah. After the palace was besieged, Ṣaqr surrendered with his group to the federal authorities. However, Sharjah's ruler Sheikh Khalid had already been killed in the palace. The incident was a direct attack on the authority of a member emirate of the UAE and the murder of a ruler and Supreme Council member and it constituted a test for the new union at a time when the wound caused by the occupation of the three islands had not yet healed. On 25 January 1972, the ruling family in Sharjah met to choose a new ruler for the emirate, and Sheikh Sultan bin Muhammad Al-Qasimi, the brother of the late ruler, was unanimously chosen to succeed him. The Supreme Council met in emergency session to consider the situation, and besides issuing an obituary of Sheikh Khālid, officially proclaimed the accession.

The move to form a union took place at a time of unprecedented instability in the region, with a border dispute that resulted 22 deaths in Kalba, and a coup in Sharjah in January 1972. The then emir of Qatar was deposed by his cousin in February 1972.

21st century

2001–2003 
After the 9/11 terrorist attacks on the United States, the UAE was identified as a major financial centre used by Al-Qaeda in transferring money to the hijackers. The nation immediately cooperated with the United States, freezing accounts tied to suspected terrorists and strongly clamping down on money laundering. The country had already signed a military defence agreement with the United States in 1994 and one with France in 1977.

The UAE supports military operations from the United States and other coalition nations engaged in the invasion of Afghanistan (2001) and Iraq (2003) as well as operations supporting the Global War on Terrorism for the Horn of Africa at Al Dhafra Air Base, located outside of Abu Dhabi. The air base also supported Allied operations during the 1991 Persian Gulf War and Operation Northern Watch.

2004–2008 
On 2 November 2004, the UAE's first president, Sheikh Zayed bin Sultan Al Nahyan, died. His eldest son, Sheikh Khalifa bin Zayed Al Nahyan, succeeded him as ruler of Abu Dhabi. In accordance with the constitution, the UAE's Supreme Council of Rulers elected Khalifa as president. Sheikh Mohammad bin Zayed Al Nahyan succeeded Khalifa as Crown Prince of Abu Dhabi. In January 2006, Sheikh Maktoum bin Rashid Al Maktoum, the prime minister of the UAE and the ruler of Dubai, died, and Crown Prince Sheikh Mohammed bin Rashid Al Maktoum assumed both roles.

In March 2006, the United States forced the state-owned Dubai Ports World to relinquish control of terminals at six major American ports. Critics of the ports deal feared an increased risk of terrorist attack, saying the UAE had been home to two of the 9/11 hijackers.

In December 2006, the UAE prepared for its first election to determine half the members of UAE's Federal National Council from 450 candidates. However, only 7000 Emirati citizens, less than 1% of the Emirati population, were given the right to vote in the election. The exact manner of selection was opaque. Notably, women were included in the electorate.

2011- 
In August 2011, the Middle East saw a number of pro-democratic uprisings, popularly known as the Arab Spring. The UAE saw comparatively little unrest, but did face one high-profile case in which five political activists were arrested on charges of breaking United Arab Emirates law of defamation by insulting heads of state, namely UAE president Khalifa bin Zayed Al Nahyan, vice president Mohammed bin Rashid Al Maktoum, and Abu Dhabi crown prince Mohammed bin Zayed Al Nahyan through running an anti-government website that express anti-government views. The trial of the UAE Five attracted international publicity and protest from a number of human rights groups, including Amnesty International, which named the five men prisoners of conscience. The defendants were convicted and given two- to three-year prison sentences on 27 November 2011.

In 2020, a UK court ruled that Sheikh Mohammed bin Rashid Al Maktoum had kidnapped and imprisoned his daughters, Shamsa and Latifa.

In early 2020s, the UAE began overhauling its criminal and civil laws. It legalized alcohol, stopped allowing lighter punishments for honor killings, enacted harsher punishments for rape and sexual harassment, allowed foreigners to follow their home country family laws for marriage and inheritance rather than local Sharia, reduced penalties for drugs, reduced penalties for having a child while unmarried, and allowed unmarried couples to live together. Economic changes have allowed foreigners to own businesses without a UAE partner, and at the beginning of 2022 moved to a Saturday-Sunday weekend with Friday as a working half-day. Homosexuality remained illegal, and though a new 21+ age rating will allow uncensored movies to be shown, freedom of speech is not guaranteed, and government critics continue to have other human rights concerns.

On 14 May 2022, Sheikh Mohamed bin Zayed Al Nahyan was elected as  the UAE's new president after the death of Sheikh Khalifa bin Zayed Al Nahyan.

See also 

 History of Asia
 History of the Middle East
 History of Dubai and Timeline of Dubai
 History of Oman
 Timeline of Abu Dhabi
 List of presidents of the United Arab Emirates
 List of prime ministers of the United Arab Emirates
 National Center for Documentation and Research
 Politics of the United Arab Emirates

References

Further reading
The Evolution of the Armed Forces of the United Arab Emirates by Athol Yates https://www.helion.co.uk/military-history-books/the-evolution-of-the-armed-forces-of-the-united-arab-emirates-.php

External links
 The 1820 General Maritime Treaty
 Timeline of the United Arab Emirates History from Bronze Age to present day